Marvel 2099 is a Marvel Comics imprint, started in 1992, that was originally one possible future of the Marvel Universe, but later revealed in a climax of Superior Spider-Man Goblin Nation arc and Amazing Spider-Man Vol. 3 #14 to be the Earth of the prime Marvel continuity in the distant future. It was originally announced by Stan Lee in his "Stan's Soapbox" column as a single series entitled The Marvel World of Tomorrow, which was being developed by Lee and John Byrne. This later changed to a line of books under the banner Marvel 2093 (the date being one hundred years from the year in which the titles launched) before finally being published as Marvel 2099.

Three of the initial four titles launched—Doom 2099, Punisher 2099, and Spider-Man 2099—starred futuristic takes on pre-existing characters. The fourth, Ravage 2099, featured an all-new superhero, scripted for several months by Stan Lee. The 2099 line soon expanded to include 2099 Unlimited, Fantastic Four 2099, Ghost Rider 2099, Hulk 2099, X-Men 2099, and X-Nation 2099. While it has been confirmed to be a possible future version of Earth-616, the mainstream Marvel Universe, the 2099 universe has been officially designated as Earth-928 and alternatively dubbed as Earth-616 circa 2099.

Publication history
The initial universe began with Spider-Man 2099, Ravage 2099, Doom 2099, and Punisher 2099 being launched in subsequent months. Peter David wrote Spider-Man for the bulk of the series, and it was consistently the most popular series. It satirized corporations, with Spider-Man constantly clashing with Alchemax, which employed him in his secret identity. Stan Lee wrote the first eight issues of Ravage as an extremely political story about corruption, corporate pollution, and the environment. After Lee left, he was replaced by a series of writers . In 1993, Wizard reported that the 2099 line had "gone over fairly well with the fans".

Growth and decline
Fans requested further titles, and Marvel provided X-Men 2099. They also introduced a Hulk 2099 in the series 2099 Unlimited, which featured occasional Spider-Man 2099 stories, as well as early work by Warren Ellis. The comics had a strong degree of interconnectivity that was similar to comics published by Marvel in the 1960s due to the imprint's editor Joey Cavalieri. The only cross-title crossover within the 2099 universe, The Fall of the Hammer, detailed a plot by the corporations to technologically recreate the Norse pantheon, along with a new Thor, to distract attention from the anti-corporate superheroes.

The 2099 series expanded to include Ghost Rider 2099, about a hero whose consciousness had been downloaded into a robotic body. Hulk 2099 was also given a brief chance at his own series. As sales began to flag on all titles besides Spider-Man and X-Men, Marvel commissioned ideas from various writers, including a proposal by Grant Morrison and Mark Millar, before accepting Warren Ellis's idea that Doom 2099, revealed to be, in fact, Victor Von Doom, would take over the United States. Each title had the modifier "A.D." ("After Doom") added on the logo to reflect the change. The new storyline allowed Marvel to cancel several low-selling titles (Hulk, Ravage,  and The Punisher). The in-universe reason for the heroes' deaths was President Rogers (an impostor Captain America who was instated after Doom was violently ousted from office) ordered the execution of the super heroes, including Punisher, Hulk and a handful of low-tier heroes who had appeared in 2099 Unlimited.

In 1996, when Marvel, during a cost-cutting exercise, fired Cavalieri, many of the 2099 creators (including Peter David and Warren Ellis) quit the line in protest. With the line floundering, two additional titles were launched: X-Nation 2099, a spin-off of X-Men 2099, and Fantastic Four 2099, which featured characters who were apparently the present day Fantastic Four accidentally sent into the future.

Around this time, Doom 2099 became the only 2099 comic to crossover with a present-day Marvel comic when he traveled back to 1996 and met Daredevil, the Fantastic Four, and Namor in a story partially told in Fantastic Four #413. Spider-Man 2099 met the original Spider-Man in a special one-shot issue, making them the only characters to meet their counterparts.

End of the imprint

After sales slumped, the 2099 titles were canceled and replaced by 2099: World of Tomorrow, a single title featuring the surviving characters from all the titles. The series lasted only eight issues before being canceled.

The 2099 line was concluded with a one-shot, 2099: Manifest Destiny (March 1998), in which Captain America was found in suspended animation and, with Miguel O'Hara, assembled various 2099 heroes into a new team of Avengers. The story summarized the years from 2099 to 3099, with humanity transforming the corporate world of 2099 into a utopia and then expanding into space.

Subsequent appearances
The 2099 world has been seen occasionally since, most notably in Peter David's "Future Tense" storyline in Captain Marvel, which revisited both Spider-Man 2099 and the alternate future of the Maestro that David created in The Incredible Hulk: Future Imperfect, explaining a plot point which had been left dangling since David had abruptly left Spider-Man 2099.

In 2004, writer Robert Kirkman wrote a series of one-shot comics for the fifth anniversary of the Marvel Knights imprint, under the heading Marvel Knights 2099. The future portrayed in this series is unconnected to the original 2099 Universe, which included a different Punisher 2099.

In 2005, the Official Handbook of the Marvel Universe one-shot, involving alternate universes, designated the Earth of 2099 as Earth-928, with Marvel Knights 2099 designated as Earth-2992. A cover of a second printing from the Spider-Man storyline "The Other: Evolve or Die" features Miguel O'Hara / Spider-Man 2099.

In 2006, the Exiles visited the Marvel Universe 2099 in Exiles #75-76 as part of the "World Tour" arc. This future had split apart from the mainstream 2099 fairly early, as Doom 2099 had not yet met Spider-Man 2099. Spider-Man 2099 joined the Exiles and left with them.

In 2009 Marvel published miniseries "Timestorm," crossing the current Marvel Universe with yet another alternate version of 2099.  The Spider-Man 2099 of this reality is a teenager.

In 2013, Spider-Man 2099 became trapped in the mainstream Marvel Universe in The Superior Spider-Man. In 2014 he would star in an ongoing series and become involved in the "Spider-Verse" storyline, along with numerous other alternate reality Spider-Men. Notably the Spider-Men 2099s of the "Exiles" and "Timestorm" series are killed during this event. At the end of this storyline, the 2099 timeline has been altered.

The 2099 universe is involved in the 2015 storyline "Secret Wars".

In 2016, an issue of Deadpool debuted the 2099 version of Deadpool.

In 2019,  in Amazing Spider-Man #25, Dr. Connors is giving a lecture on the negligence of the world and environment due to focus on the countless occurrences of superhero activity will end up negatively impacting the future, to the point of catastrophe. Meanwhile, set to his lecture, strange weather phenomenon is occurring above a burning oil rig. A rift opens in the sky and a figure falls out of it, landing on the dock of the rig. The workers un-bury the figure, revealing an unconscious Spider-Man 2099. There was later a series of one-shots to celebrate the 25th anniversary of Marvel 2099. It incorporated the ongoing storyline from Amazing Spider-Man that not only reintroduced Spider-Man 2099, Fantastic Four 2099, Doom 2099, Punisher 2099, and Venom 2099 in individual one-shot issues, but also introduced Conan 2099.

Setting
The world of 2099 is a cyberpunk dystopia (similar to the world of Blade Runner). North America is a corporate police state ruled by a few huge megacorporations, most notably Alchemax, which owns the private police force the Public Eye (which primarily punishes criminals' bank accounts). There were, prior to the launch of the comics, no active superheroes in this world, and the previous heroes are mythologized through religion, as with the Church of Thor. The present-day Marvel continuity is referred to as an "Age of Heroes" that abruptly ended in a catastrophe a century before that also set back society (this catastrophe was averted in the present when Miguel O'Hara- Spider-Man 2099- temporarily swapped places with his past self shortly before the cataclysm, turning Miguel's world into an alternate future of the Marvel Universe rather than the future).

Card system
In the 2099 Universe, the monetary currency system uses implants commonly known as cards, which are credit ID implants. There are aluminum cards, gold cards, and platinum cards. Another type of card are black cards, which give the owner unlimited funds and law immunity.

Characters

Heroes

Protagonists
 Doom (Victor Von Doom)
 Ghost Rider (Zero Cochrane)
 Hulk (John Eisenhart)
 Punisher (Jake Gallows)
 Ravage (Paul-Phillip Ravage)
 Spider-Man (Miguel O'Hara)

X-Men 2099
 Bloodhawk (Lemuel Krugg)
 Cerebra (Shakti Haddad)
 Junkpile
 Krystalin (Krystalin Porter Ogada)
 La Lunatica
 Meanstreak (Henri Huang)
 Metalhead (Eddie Van Beethoven-Osako)
 Serpentina (Kimberly Potters)
 Skullfire (Timothy Sean Michael Fitzgerald)
 Desert Ghost (Xi'an Chi Xan)

X-Nation 2099
 Cerebra (Shakti Haddad)
 Clarion (Hayes Isaacs)
 December (December Frost)
 Metalsmith
 Nostromo
 Twilight
 Uproar
 Willow
 Wulff

Fantastic Four 2099
 Human Torch (double of Johnny Storm)
 Invisible Woman (double of Sue Storm)
 Mister Fantastic (double of Reed Richards)
 Thing (double of Ben Grimm)

Other heroes

 Matt Axel (the Punisher's armorer)
 Barrio Man
 Captain America (imposter posing as Steve Rogers)
 Daredevil 2099
 Dr. Apollo (Dr. Nikolai Apolonio)
 Freakshow (Mama Hurricane, Breakdown, Rosa, Metalhead, Psyclone, Contagion, Tantrum, and Dominic)
 Galahad, human connected to robot
 The Ghostworks
 Goldheart
 Lachryma 2099
 The Lawless (Xi'an Chi Xan, Victor Ten Eagles, Junkpile, Broken Haiku, Mongrel, Auntie Maim, and the Reverend)
 Metalscream 2099
 Moon Knight 2099
 Net Prophet (John Roger Tensen, also known as Justice)
 S.H.I.E.L.D. 2099
 Steel Rain
 Thor 2099 (Reverend Cecil McAdams)
 Vendetta
 Hazzard 2099
 Duke Stratosphere
 Captain America 2099 (Roberta Mendez, debuts in Secret Wars 2099 and appears in Spider-Man 2099 volume 3)
 Black Widow 2099
 Hawkeye 2099
 Iron Man 2099
 Deadpool 2099
Iron Fist 2099

Villains

 Adonai (leader of LA "locusts")
 False Aesir (Thor/Cecil McAdams, Hela/Tiana, Loki/Jordan Boone, Balder, Heimdall)
 Anti-Hulk
 The Architect (Ryu Kobolt)
 Avatarr (CEO of Alchemax; secretly an alien)
 Brimstone Love and the Theatre of Pain
 Captain America (an impostor posing as Steve Rogers)
 Coda
 Dethstryk and the Mutroids of Hellrock
 Discord
 Doctor Octopus 2099
 Draco
 Electro 2099
 Exodus
 Fearmaster (Darryl King)
 Fever
 Flipside
 Goblin
 Glitterspike
 Gearbox
 The Golden One
 Halloween Jack (Jordan Boone, also known as Loki; later traveled to the present in X-Force #92)
 Heartbreaker
 Anderthorp Henton (Director-General of ECO)
 Hotwire (Dean Gallows, son of Jake Gallows)
 Multi-Fractor/Jigsaw
 Dyson Kellerman (CEO of Transverse City Security)
 L-Cypher
 The Norns of the Theatre of Pain (Felicity, Bliss, Euphoria)
 Public Enemy (Saber Hagen)
 The Rat Pack (the Dealer, the Suicide Master, Mister Entertainment)
 Sandwoman
 The Shadow Dancer
 The Specialist
 Tyler Stone (dictator of Latveria in 2099 and former employee of Alchemax )
 The Synge Family (Noah, Lytton, and Desdemona)
 Technarchy/Phalanx
 Thanatos (Aaron Delgado possessed by an alternate-reality version of Rick Jones)
 Tiger Wylde
 Vengeance 2099
 Venom (Kron Stone)
 Venture (Queeg)
 Vulture 2099
 Master Zhao and the Chosen (One-Eyed Jack, Psycho-K, Frostbite, Wingspan, and Monster)

Mega-corporations
 Alchemax (CEO Avatarr; VP Tyler Stone) and its subsidiaries
 ECO Corp. (CEO Ravage; Director-General Anderthorp Henton)
 Public Eye (Director Fearmaster)
 R&D Department (Director Tyler Stone; employees include Miguel O'Hara, Jordan Boone, and Aaron Delgado)
 Cyber-Nostra (controlled by Fearmaster)
 D/MONIX (Data Manipulation and Organization Networks) (CEO Dyson Kellerman; employees include Harrison Cochrane [Ghost Rider's father])
 Greater Nevada Syndicate (controlled by the Synge Family)
 Green Globe PLC (founded by the Ravage family)
 Ninja-Nostra
 Stark-Fujikawa (formerly Stark Enterprises) (CEO Hikaru-sama)
 Synthia (CEO Darrius Rush; employees include Mannix Dunn, Dana D'Angelo [Spider-Man's fiancée], Alain Gris [Group Manager for Sky Plantations])

Marvel Knights 2099 heroes

 Black Panther (K'Shamba)
 Daredevil (Samuel Fisk)
 The Inhumans
 Mutant 2099 (Chad Channing)
 Punisher (Cassondra Castle)

2099 series and one-shots

In other media

Television
 In the Iron Man: Armored Adventures episode "Iron Man 2099", Andros Stark, Tony Stark's grandson from the year 2099, travels back in time to kill Tony before he creates an AI named Vortex that would go on to destroy most of humanity. After Tony escapes, Andros is forced to ally himself with Justin Hammer, who is known as a hero in 2099, while Hammer manipulates him into attacking the S.H.I.E.L.D. Helicarrier to preserve his successful future. Andros fights Iron Man, Hawkeye, and S.H.I.E.L.D. until he kills Tony, though not without being infected by a virus Tony created to shut down his advanced armor. Realizing that this virus would evolve into Vortex and that he was the one who doomed the world, Andros uses his suit's leftover power to go back in time and stop himself from killing Tony, successfully changing the future at the cost of his existence.
 In the Ultimate Spider-Man episode "The Spider-Verse: Part 1", the Marvel 2099 universe appears as the first of six parallel universes that Spider-Man ends up in while pursuing the Green Goblin. This version of 2099 has an incarnation of J. Jonah Jameson, who rants about Spider-Man 2099. While hunting down the Green Goblin, Spider-Man encounters Spider-Man 2099, who is considering giving up his superhero career as his enemies always come back. After a brief brawl, the two are attacked by the Green Goblin, who gets Spider-Man 2099's DNA, attempts to demolish a nearby tower, and flees to another parallel universe. The two Spider-Men manage to keep the tower from falling using their combined webbing skills, and Spider-Man 2099 is convinced by his predecessor to not give up and continue on. After saying goodbye to his 2099 counterpart, Spider-Man follows Green Goblin.
 In the Avengers Assemble episode "The House of Zemo", Helmut Zemo uses time-traveling technology previously owned by Kang the Conqueror to bring his father, Heinrich Zemo, to the present. However, upon deciding that his son was a disappointment, the latter uses the same portal to summon a cyborg Zemo from the year 2099 and have it attack the Avengers, but disappears after he is sent back to his own time.

Film
 In the post-credit scene of Spider-Man: Into the Spider-Verse, Miguel O'Hara / Spider-Man 2099 makes a brief appearance in his futuristic universe, voiced by Oscar Isaac.

Video games
 A planned video game for the Sony PlayStation, titled Marvel 2099: One Nation Under Doom, was heavily promoted. Although developed to a point of playability, the title was never commercially released.
 Spider-Man 2099 appears as an unlockable costume in the 2000 Spider-Man video game, Spider-Man 2: Enter Electro, the Wii edition of Spider-Man: Web of Shadows, The Amazing Spider-Man movie tie-in game, The Amazing Spider-Man 2 movie tie-in game, and the 2018 Spider-Man video game.
 Ghost Rider 2099 appears as an unlockable costume in the Ghost Rider movie tie-in game and a downloadable costume in Ultimate Marvel vs. Capcom 3.
 The Marvel 2099 reality appears in Spider-Man: Shattered Dimensions as one of four realities affected by the shattering of an ancient artifact, the Tablet of Order and Chaos. Madame Webb contacts the Spider-Men of the four realities to re-assemble the tablet or else all four worlds will be destroyed. Spider-Man 2099 appears with free-falling sections and an Accelerated Vision ability that makes everything seem slower. In the game, he goes up against an insane Hobgoblin, the Timestorm 2009–2099 version of Scorpion, and a female Doctor Octopus. The Nintendo DS version also features a 2099 version of Silvermane. The player can also unlock three alternate costumes for Spider-Man 2099: Flipside, the Spider-Armor, and Iron Spider.
 The Marvel 2099 reality appears in Spider-Man: Edge of Time. In the game, Alchemax scientist Walker Sloan goes back in time to start the company in the 1970s, allowing them rule Nueva York. Spider-Man 2099 becomes aware of this after being trapped within Sloan's time portal. After contacting his predecessor, the two Spider-Men join forces to correct the timeline. During the game, they encounter a 2099 version of Black Cat and learn the Alchemax CEO is an insane future version of Peter Parker who manipulated Sloan into creating the time portal in an attempt to control its quantum power and change history. The Nintendo DS version features 2099 versions of Arcade, Big Wheel, and a female Overdrive.
 The Human Torch 2099 from the "Timestorm 2009-2099" storyline and Hulk 2099 appear as costumes in Marvel Heroes.
 Spider-Man, Goblin, Venom, Flipside, and other characters from 2099 appear as playable characters and bosses in the mobile title Spider-Man Unlimited, with Nueva York appearing as a stage in a special event.
 2099's Spider-Man, Captain America, Black Widow, and Iron-Man appear as playable characters in the mobile title Marvel Future Fight.
 Spider-Man 2099 and Punisher 2099 appear as playable characters in the mobile title Marvel Contest of Champions. These versions come from a 2099 ruled by HYDRA. A 2099 version of original character Guillotine also appears; this iteration being a robot duplicate of the original built by a time-hopping Mephisto.
 2099's Spider-Man, Captain America, and Ghost Rider appear in the mobile title Marvel Avengers Academy.
 Nueva York and the Marvel 2099 universe appears in Lego Marvel Super Heroes 2, with the former being used by Kang the Conqueror to form Chronopolis. 2099's Spider-Man, Captain America, Hulk, Goblin, Electro, and Venom appear as playable characters.

See also
 Timestorm 2009–2099
 Marvel Comics multiverse

References

 
Dystopian comics
Cyberpunk comics
Marvel Comics dimensions
Marvel Comics imprints